Farmahin Rural District is a rural district (dehestan) in the Central District of Farahan County, Markazi Province, Iran. At the 2006 census, its population was 12,220, in 3,519 families. The rural district has 36 villages.

References 

Rural Districts of Markazi Province
Farahan County